Giovanni Conversini, also known as Giovanni di Conversino or John of Ravenna  (Buda, 1343 – Muggia, 27 September 1408), was an Italian educator, whose students included  Vittorino da Feltre and Guarino da Verona. He is one of two individuals of that name in Petrarch's letters.

A son of Conversanus, he was first heard of on November 17, 1368 as appointed to the professorship of rhetoric at Florence, where he had for some time held the post of notary at the courts of justice. About 1370, he entered the service of the ducal house of Padua, the Carraras, in which he continued at least until 1404, although the whole of that period was not spent in Padua. Between 1375 and 1379, he was a schoolmaster at Belluno, but was dismissed as "too good for his post" and "not adapted for teaching boys". On March 22, 1382, he was appointed professor of rhetoric at Padua.

During the struggle between the Carraresi and Visconti families, he spent five years at Udine, from 1387 to 1392. Between 1395 and 1404, he was chancellor of Francis of Carrara, and is heard of for the last time in 1406 as living at Venice. His history of the Carraras, a tasteless production in barbarous Latin, says little for his literary capacity; but as a teacher he enjoyed a great reputation, amongst his pupils being Vittorino da Feltre and Guarino da Verona.

Notes

References

Further reading
 
 

 
 
 
 
 

1343 births
1408 deaths
Academic staff of the University of Florence
professor
14th-century Italian jurists
15th-century Italian jurists